The men's 5000 metres event was part of the track and field athletics programme at the 1920 Summer Olympics. The competition was held on Monday, August 16, 1920, and on Tuesday, August 17, 1920. Thirty-eight runners from 16 nations competed.

Competition format

The competition consisted of two rounds. First four semifinals were held of 9 to 10 runners with the top four in each heat advancing. The final race was then held the next day with 16 competitors.

Records

These were the standing world and Olympic records (in minutes) prior to the 1920 Summer Olympics.

Schedule

Results

Semifinals

Semifinal 1

Semifinal 2

Semifinal 3

Semifinal 4

Final

References

Notes
 
 

5000 metres
5000 metres at the Olympics